Kanchanaburi City Football Club (Thai สโมสรฟุตบอล กาญจนบุรี ซิตี้), is a Thai football club based in Tha Muang, Kanchanaburi, Thailand. The club is currently playing in the Thai League 3 Western region.

History
In early 2022, the club was established and competed in Thailand Amateur League Western region, using the Khao Noi Municipality Stadium as the ground. At the end of the season, the club could be promoted to the Thai League 3. They use the Khao Noi Municipality Stadium as a ground to compete for the T3 in the 2022–23 season.

In late 2022, Kanchanaburi City competed in the Thai League 3 for the 2022–23 season. It is their first season in the professional league. The club started the season with a 4–1 away win over Saraburi United and they ended the season with a 2–0 home win over the Saraburi United. The club has finished fourth place in the league of the Western region. In addition, in the 2022–23 Thai FA Cup Kanchanaburi City was defeated 1–2 by Wat Bot City in the second round, causing them to be eliminated and in the 2022–23 Thai League Cup Kanchanaburi City defeated 1–2 to Pathumthani University in the first qualification round, causing them to be eliminated too.

Stadium and locations

Season by season record

P = Played
W = Games won
D = Games drawn
L = Games lost
F = Goals for
A = Goals against
Pts = Points
Pos = Final position

QR1 = First Qualifying Round
QR2 = Second Qualifying Round
R1 = Round 1
R2 = Round 2
R3 = Round 3
R4 = Round 4

R5 = Round 5
R6 = Round 6
QF = Quarter-finals
SF = Semi-finals
RU = Runners-up
W = Winners

Players

Current squad

References

External links
 Thai League official website
 Club's info from Thai League official website

Association football clubs established in 2022
Football clubs in Thailand
Kanchanaburi province
2022 establishments in Thailand